Somersby cider is a brand of 4.5% abv cider by Danish brewing company Carlsberg Group. Developed in 2008, it was originally developed for the Danish market, but today has been launched in more than 46 markets, including all of Europe, Israel, Nepal, Australia, New Zealand, Malaysia, Hong Kong, Taiwan, Thailand, South Korea, Canada and the United States. Of the world's ten biggest cider brands, Somersby was the one that grew most in 2012.

In 2012, Carlsberg UK developed and introduced a new version of Somersby Cider specific to the United Kingdom market. Somersby Cider UK is a 4.5% ABV medium dry cider with no artificial flavours or sweeteners.

Despite its Danish origin, the cider is marketed in many territories as being the creation of "Lord Somersby", a fictional English Lord.

Varieties
Apart from pure apple cider, the Somersby brand is also being used for pear cider, blackberry-flavoured apple cider, rhubarb, elderflower, ginger lemon, blueberry, apple burst, cranberry-flavoured apple cider, citrus-flavoured apple cider, watermelon-flavoured apple cider and a calorie-reduced apple cider.

In Poland, the brand Somersby is used by Carlsberg to market fruit-flavoured beer instead of cider. This is due to the relative unpopularity of cider as a type of drink among Polish customers, as well as legal restrictions on the sale and marketing of cider in the country, which include a ban on advertisement.

Somersby Apple Cider

 Appearance: Light Amber
 Aroma: Granny Smith Apples.
 Taste: Very Sweet, But Not Candied.
 Mouthfeel: Slightly Bubbly.
 Alcohol content: 4.5%

Ingredients:

Water, fermented apple juice, sugar, apple juice concentrate, citric acid (acidity Regulator), flavour (apple), potassium sorbate (as a Preservative), caramel colour.

Somersby Pear Cider

 Appearance: Pale with a yellow tinge.
 Aroma: Sweet pear.
 Taste: Sweet and crisp. Refreshing on a warm day.
 Mouthfeel: Slightly Bubbly.
 Alcohol content: 4.5%

Ingredients:

Purified drinking water, concentrated pear juice, sugar, pH-adjusting agent – citric acid.

″Apple Beer Drink″
In Poland, Switzerland and Quebec, Carlsberg uses Somersby brand for a beverage that is mixture of beer (45%) and apple flavoured drink (55%). 
Since this product cannot be classified as a cider, it is sold as Apple Beer Drink.

See also 

 List of cider brands

References

Further reading
 Virtue, Graeme (26 April 2013). "The new Somersby advert: it's time for iCider". The Guardian.
 Somersby Cider Case Study: Establishing an Alcohol Category Adjacent to Beer. Datamonitor Plc. 2010.
 Kleinman, Alexis (March 27, 2013). "Somersby Cider's New Commercial Pokes Fun At Apple". Huffington Post. 
 "Somersby Cider boosts presence in pubs". The Publican's Morning Advertiser. 
 "Somersby Cider Builds Its Own Genius Bar Inside a Fake Apple Store Light on the palate, heavy on the puns". Ad Week.
 "Carlsberg extends social content drive to Somersby cider brand". Marketing Week.

External links 

Brands of cider
Danish brands
Carlsberg Group
Products introduced in 2008